The 2008 edition of The National was held December 3–7, 2008 at the ExpoCité in Quebec City, Quebec. It was the second Grand Slam event of the men's 2008-09 World Curling Tour season.

Teams

(Money ranking in parentheses)

Pool A

Howard 6-2 Larway
Burtnyk 5-3 McEwen
Middaugh 7-2 Adams
Middaugh 5-3 Larway
McEwen 5-4 Howard (9)
Burtnyk 6-3 Adams
McEwen 8-4 Middaugh
Burtnyk 6-5 Howard (9)
Adams 6-1 Larway
Middaugh 6-3 Burtnyk
Adams 6-0 Howard
McEwen 6-3 Larway
McEwen 4-3 Adams
Burtnyk 7-3 Larway
Middaugh 6-5 Howard

Pool B

Ménard 7-6 Simmons
McAulay 9-8 Wang (9)
Martin 7-6 Gushue (9)
Martin 6-3 McAulay
Simmons 7-5 Wang 
Gushue 5-4 Ménard
Gushue 6-3 McAulay
Martin 5-3 Simmons
Gushue 6-4 Wang
Martin 6-4 Ménard
Simmons 6-4 McAulay
McAulay 7-6 Ménard
Gushue 3-2 Simmons
Martin 6-3 Wang
Ménard 8-4 Wang

Pool C

Ferland 5-2 Koe
Stoughton 6-3 Ursel
Ferbey 9-4 Jordison
Ursel 6-4 Ferland
Koe 12-5 Jordison
Stoughton 7-5 Ferbey
Jordison 5-4 Ursel
Stoughton 6-5 Ferland (9)
Ferbey 7-3 Ursel
Stoughton 8-6 Koe
Ferland 5-4 Jordison
Koe 6-4 Ursel 
Ferland 6-3 Ferbey
Stoughton 4-3 Jordison
Ferbey 6-2 Koe

Playoffs
Playoffs

Final

References

External links

National, 2008
Curling competitions in Quebec City
2008 in Quebec
National, 2008
The National (curling)